Kentiopsis is a genus of palm trees endemic to New Caledonia. Relationships between Kentiopsis and the other genera of subtribe Archontophoenicinae, including the Australian Archontophoenix and the New Caledonia endemic Chambeyronia and Actinokentia are unresolved.

It contains four known species:

 Kentiopsis magnifica (H.E.Moore) Pintaud & Hodel
 Kentiopsis oliviformis (Brongn. & Gris) Brongn.
 Kentiopsis piersoniorum Pintaud & Hodel
 Kentiopsis pyriformis Pintaud & Hodel

References

 
Arecaceae genera
Endemic flora of New Caledonia
Taxonomy articles created by Polbot
Taxa named by Adolphe-Théodore Brongniart